In probability theory and statistics, the asymmetric Laplace distribution (ALD) is a continuous probability distribution which is a generalization of the Laplace distribution. Just as the Laplace distribution consists of two  exponential distributions of equal scale back-to-back about x = m,  the asymmetric Laplace consists of two exponential distributions of unequal scale back to back about x = m, adjusted to assure continuity and normalization. The difference of two variates exponentially distributed with different means and rate parameters will be distributed according to the ALD. When the two rate parameters are equal, the difference will be distributed according to the Laplace distribution.

Characterization

Probability density function

A random variable has an asymmetric Laplace(m, λ, κ) distribution if its probability density function is

where s=sgn(x-m), or alternatively:

Here, m is a location parameter, λ > 0 is a scale parameter, and κ is an asymmetry parameter. When κ = 1, (x-m)s κs simplifies to |x-m| and the distribution simplifies to the Laplace distribution.

Cumulative distribution function

The cumulative distribution function is given by:

Characteristic function

The ALD characteristic function is given by:

For m = 0, the ALD is a member of the family of geometric stable distributions with α = 2.

is also an ALD characteristic function with location parameter . The new scale parameter λ obeys

and the new skewness parameter κ obeys:

Moments, mean, variance, skewness

The n-th moment of the ALD about m is given by

From the binomial theorem, the n-th moment about zero (for m not zero) is then:

where  is the generalized exponential integral function 

The first moment about zero is the mean:

The variance is:

and the skewness is:

Generating asymmetric Laplace variates

Asymmetric Laplace variates (X) may be generated from a random variate U drawn from the uniform distribution in the interval (-κ,1/κ) by:

where s=sgn(U).

They may also be generated as the difference of two exponential distributions. If X1 is drawn from exponential distribution with mean and rate (m1,λ/κ) and X2 is drawn from an exponential distribution with mean and rate (m2,λκ) then X1 - X2 is distributed according to the asymmetric Laplace distribution with parameters (m1-m2, λ, κ)

Entropy

The differential entropy of the ALD is

The ALD has the maximum entropy of all distributions with a fixed value (1/λ) of  where .

Alternative parametrization

An alternative parametrization is made possible by the characteristic function:

where   is a location parameter,  is a scale parameter,  is an asymmetry parameter. This is specified in Section 2.6.1 and Section 3.1 of Lihn (2015).
 Its probability density function is

It follows that .

Thus  represents skewness in an almost direct way.

Alternative parameterization for Bayesian quantile regression
The Asymmetric Laplace distribution is commonly used with an alternative parameterization for performing quantile regression in a Bayesian inference context. Under this approach, the  parameter describing asymmetry is replaced with a  parameter indicating the percentile or quantile desired. Using this parameterization, the likelihood of the Asymmetric Laplace Distribution is equivalent to the loss function employed in quantile regression. With this alternative parameterization, the probability density function is defined as:

Where, m is a location parameter, λ > 0 is a scale parameter, and 0 < p < 1 is a percentile parameter. 

The mean and variance are calculated as:

The cumulative distribution function is given by:

Applications
The asymmetric Laplace distribution has applications in finance and neuroscience.  For the example in finance, S.G. Kou developed a model for financial instrument prices incorporating an asymmetric Laplace distribution to address problems of skewness, kurtosis and the volatility smile that often occur when using a normal distribution for pricing these instruments. Another example is in neuroscience in which its convolution with normal distribution is considered as a model for brain stopping reaction times.

References

Continuous distributions
Exponential family distributions
Location-scale family probability distributions
Geometric stable distributions